Ćelije is a village situated in Gadžin Han municipality, Nišava District in Serbia.

References

Populated places in Nišava District